Wheat is a grass widely cultivated for its seed, a cereal grain which is a worldwide staple food.

Wheat may also refer to:

 Wheat (surname)
 Wheat (band), indie rock band
 Wheat (color), a color resembling the color of wheat grain
 Wheat, Tennessee, a former community, United States
 Wheat, West Virginia, an unincorporated community, United States
 Wheat (film), a Chinese movie

See also
 Thinopyrum intermedium, an intermediate wheatgrass
 WEAT, a radio station licensed to the West Palm Beach, Florida market.